Dalla diraspes is a species of butterfly in the family Hesperiidae. It is found in Brazil (Rio de Janeiro, Minas Gerais) and Bolivia.

References

Butterflies described in 1877
diraspes
Hesperiidae of South America
Taxa named by William Chapman Hewitson